Charlwood House is an early 17th-century timber-framed country house  in Lowfield Heath, Crawley, West Sussex, England. It is a Grade II* listed building which is now used as a nursery school.

The tiled roof uses Horsham stone.  A substantial extension was built in the same style in the 20th century.

See also
Charlwood (disambiguation)

References

Buildings and structures in Crawley
Country houses in West Sussex
Grade II* listed buildings in West Sussex